Giovanni Antonio Acquaviva d'Aragona (died 1525) was a Roman Catholic prelate who served as Bishop of Lecce (1517–1525)
and Bishop of Alessano (1512–1517).

Biography
On 3 March 1512, Giovanni Antonio Acquaviva d'Aragona was appointed by Pope Julius II as Bishop of Alessano.
 
On 18 May 1517, he was appointed by Pope Leo X as Bishop of Lecce. 
He served as Bishop of Lecce until his death in 1525.

See also 
Catholic Church in Italy

References

External links and additional sources
 (for Chronology of Bishops) 
 (for Chronology of Bishops) 
 (for Chronology of Bishops) 
 (for Chronology of Bishops) 

1525 deaths
16th-century Italian Roman Catholic bishops
Bishops appointed by Pope Julius II
Bishops appointed by Pope Leo X